John Hoskyns may refer to:
Sir John Hoskyns (policy advisor) (1927–2014), policy advisor to Margaret Thatcher
Sir John Hoskyns, 2nd Baronet (1634–1705), president of the Royal Society (1682–83)
Sir John Hoskyns, 9th Baronet (1817–1911) of the Hoskyns baronets
Sir John Hoskyns, 15th Baronet (1926–1956), English cricketer, British Army officer, barrister and clergyman

See also
John Hoskins (disambiguation)